Clock Tower Beach (French: Plage de l'Horloge) is an urban beach on the Saint Lawrence River in Montreal, adjacent to the Montreal Clock Tower in the Old Port of Montreal.

Description and history
The beach opened in 2012. It consists of sand, Muskoka chairs, a boardwalk, a bar, showers and misting stations. Visitors are charged a fee for admission. Work began on the site in the fall of 2011, including the installation of parasols. The beach was designed by Claude Cormier, who has also designed urban beaches in Toronto.

References

External links
 

2012 establishments in Quebec
Beaches of Quebec
Old Montreal
Outdoor structures in Canada
Parks in Montreal
Urban beaches